The first election to Rhondda Cynon Taf County Borough Council was held on 4 May 1995.  It was followed by the 1999 election.  On the same day there were elections to  the other 21 local authorities in Wales and community councils in Wales.

Overview
All council seats were up for election. These were the first elections held following local government reorganisation and the abolition of Mid Glamorgan County Council. The ward boundaries for the new authority were based on the previous Cynon Valley Borough Council, Rhondda Borough Council and Taff Ely Borough Council although the number of members elected for individual wards was reduced.

Labour won a majority of the seats.

|}

Previous members of Mid Glamorgan Council
Most sitting members of Mid Glamorgan County council sought election to the new authority. A number were also members of the previous district councils but others contested a ward against a sitting district councillor.

Results

Aberaman North (two seats)
The boundaries were identical to those of the same ward on the previous Cynon Valley Borough Council.

Aberaman South (two seats)
The boundaries were identical to those of the same ward on the previous Cynon Valley Borough Council.

Abercynon (two seats)
The boundaries were identical to those of the same ward on the previous Cynon Valley Borough Council.

Aberdare East (two seats)
The boundaries were identical to those of the same ward on the previous Cynon Valley Borough Council.

Aberdare West, Llwydcoed (three seats)

Beddau (one seat)
The boundaries were identical to those of the same ward on the previous Taff Ely Borough Council.

Brynna (one seat)

Church Village (one seat)
The boundaries were identical to those of the same ward on the previous Taff Ely Borough Council.

Cilfynydd (one seat)

Cwmbach (one seat)

Cwm Clydach (one seat)

Cymmer (two seats)

Ferndale (two seats)

Gilfach Goch (one seat)

Glyncoch (one seat)

Graig (one seat)

Hawthorn (one seat)

Hirwaun (one seat)

Llanharan (one seat)

Llanharry (one seat)
Janet Davies, leader of the Taff Ely Borough Council since 1991, was defeated by a Labour opponent.

Llantrisant (one seat)

Llantwit Fardre (two seats)

Llwynypia (one seat)

Maerdy (one seat)

Mountain Ash East (one seat)

Mountain Ash West (two seats)

Penrhiwceiber (two seats)

Pentre (two seats)

Penygraig (two seats)

Penywaun (one seat)

Pontyclun (one seat)

Pontypridd (one seat)

Porth (two seats)

Rhigos (one seat)

Rhondda (two seats)

Rhydfelen Central / Ilan (one seat)

Rhydfelen Lower (one seat)

Taffs Well (one seat)

Talbot Green (one seat)

Tonteg (two seats)
The boundaries were identical to those of the same ward on the previous Taff Ely Borough Council.

Tonypandy (one seat)

Tonyrefail East (two seats)

Tonyrefail West (one seat)

Trallwn (one seat)

Trealaw (one seat)

Trefforest (one seat)

Treherbert (two seats)

Treorchy (three seats)

Tylorstown (two seats)

Tyn-y-Nant (one seat)
The boundaries were identical to those of the same ward on the previous Taff Ely Borough Council.

Ynyshir (one seat)

Ynysybwl (one seat)

Ystrad (two seats)

References

1995 Welsh local elections
1995